Grace Huntington was an American animator and pilot. She was the second woman hired into the Disney Corporation’s lead animation department, after Retta Scot. The techniques she created in the Disney animation department have been replicated globally. As an aviator, she achieved a record altitude in her Taylorcraft light airplane of 24,310.975 ft. in 1940.

Biography

Early life 
Huntington was an avid reader of fantasy books as a young girl. Of Journey to the Center of the Earth by Jules Verne, she said, “That book left me with an unquenchable desire to someday, in some way, bring the dream of a trip to space a little closer to reality.”

Animation career 
In 1936, Huntington became the second woman ever hired to work in Disney’s lead animation department. In her first days at Disney, she was the target of many jokes from her male co-workers. They put a pig near her, and the guards kept her from entering story meetings. Huntington recalled Walt Disney himself saying, "I would never consider hiring a woman for the animation department because when she was married she would be a total loss to the studio.” At her initial hiring, she was an avid writer of short cartoons. Her animation concepts became key to Mickey and Minnie Mouse cartoons as well as the Silly Symphonies. After a few months of working for the studio, Huntington gained credibility among her coworkers by being heavily involved in the creation and design of characters and landscapes within Snow White. Huntington also quickly became an advocate for the hiring of other women, such as Dorothy Ann Blake.

Aviation career 
In tandem with her animation career, Huntington was also an avid flyer. Her brother owned and piloted his own plane, and gave Huntington access to it. The plane was a Fairchild 24 named The Blue Dragon. Huntington became extremely committed to her aviation career. She hired a teacher, and trained diligently to pilot the aircraft. She took most of her lessons at Joe Plossers flight school at Grand Central Air Terminal in Glendale, and she obtained her private license in 1937. 

During her time as a pilot, Huntington noted a significant amount of misogyny in the aviation business. She examined many issues, such as what kind of clothing to wear in cold air, how to tell when an airplane had reached its ceiling, what kind of oxygen equipment to use, and how to use it. Huntington also revolutionized the supplies that most people took up in their aircraft. She switched tools and first aid kits for a sensitive altimeter. In 1939 on a test flight, Huntington's windshield cracked when she took her plane past 20,000 feet. Luckily she was able to maneuver the plane back down to the ground. In 1939, she set the women's record for flight when she reached 18,770 feet. Huntington's big altitude record came in 1940 where she climbed her Taylorcraft to 22,700 feet.

The record for flight with a Taylorcraft at that point was 18,000 feet, and Huntington was confident that she could beat that. During the flight, she was able to destroy that record by climbing to 24,310.975 feet.

Personal life 
Grace married Berkeley Brandt Jr., who was also an avid flyer. They took many lessons together in Southern California. Berkeley Brandt Jr. became a prominent flyer for Panam. They had one son together, Brandt Jr., who later published her autobiography, Please Let me Fly, on life as “anything but a stereotypical woman”.

Huntington died from tuberculosis in 1948 at the age of 35 .

Books 
Please Let Me Fly is the life story of Grace Huntington. The published book includes lost documents, letters and photos that tell the story of a remarkable woman who served as inspiration to all women seeking their own defined roles in society.

Legacy 
Huntington's sketches of her time at Disney have become an inspiration for many, including ones of her going into a meeting with her coworkers in a full suit of armor. There have also been multiple books written about Huntington's time at Disney, such as They Drew As They Pleased, The Queens of Animation and her own autobiography called Please Let Me Fly.

See also 
 Mary Blair 
 Retta Scott 
 Martha Sigall  
 Bessie Coleman  
 Amy Johnson  
 Jacqueline Cochran
 Evelyn Kennedy

References

External links 
 Please Let Me Fly on Google Books

Date of birth missing
Date of death missing
American women aviation record holders
American women cartoonists
American cartoonists
1948 deaths